Bacterial ice-nucleation proteins is a family of proteins that enable Gram-negative bacteria to promote nucleation of ice at relatively high temperatures (above -5C). These proteins are localised at the outer membrane surface and can cause frost damage to many plants. The primary structure of the proteins contains a highly repetitive domain that dominates the sequence. The domain comprises a number of 48-residue repeats, which themselves contain 3 blocks of 16 residues, the first 8 of which are identical. It is thought that the repetitive domain may be responsible for aligning water molecules in the seed crystal. 

              [.........48.residues.repeated.domain..........]
             /              / |              | \              \
            AGYGSTxTagxxssli  AGYGSTxTagxxsxlt  AGYGSTxTaqxxsxlt
            [16.residues...]  [16.residues...]  [16.residues...]

See also
 Ice-minus bacteria

References 

Protein domains